Joyce Irene Cave (2 June 1902 – 13 March 1953) was an English squash player who won the inaugural women's British Open tournament in 1922, defeating Nancy Cave in the final 11–15, 15–10, 15–9. She also won the tournament in 1925 and 1929, defeating Nancy Cave and Cecily Fenwick respectively in the final. She was one of three sisters that participated in the British Open, her older sister Nancy Cave also won the title on three occasions and her oldest sister Margorie Maude Cave competed in 1922. All three sisters were taught by their father Harold Watkin Cave who was a rackets player during the 1880s.

References

External links
Official British Open Squash Championships website
British Open historical data at Squashtalk.com

English female squash players
1902 births
1953 deaths